Bouwer or Bouwers is a surname. Notable people with the surname include:

 Alba Bouwer (1920-2010), South African Afrikaans-writing journalist and author
 Albert Bouwers (1893–1972), Dutch optical engineer
 Ben Bouwer (Barend Daniël Bouwer, 1875-1938), Boer War general, police officer and colonel in South Africa
 Marc Bouwer, South African-born American fashion designer